Abdul Rahman Al-Ghamdi is a citizen of Saudi Arabia who is believed to have been a jihadist.

In 2003, Al-Ghamdi married Umm Hajir Al-Azdi, the sister of a Guantanamo captive, whose first husband said she was also a ‘takfeeri’. His wife's first husband told the Saudi Gazette that Al-Ghamdi "...had been killed in a confrontation with security forces in Al-Huda on the Taif to Makkah road."

In July 2003, BBC News reported that a Saudi named "Ali Abdu Rahman Al Ghamdi" was number two on a Saudi most wanted list, and that he had peacefully surrendered in 2003.
USA Today reported his name was "Ali Abd al-Rahman al-Faqasi al-Ghamdi" and that he had fought against US forces in Afghanistan.

In September 2003, the Arab News reported that a Saudi named "Bandar ibn Abdul Rahman Al-Ghamdi" was on a list of nineteen most wanted suspects, and that he had recently been extradited from Yemen with seven other Saudi suspects.

References

Saudi Arabian Muslims
Living people
1974 births
People extradited from Yemen
People extradited to Saudi Arabia